The East Valley Institute of Technology (EVIT) is a public school district serving the eastern portion of the Phoenix, Arizona metro area. It is a joint technological education district with programs are available to students at the member high schools. EVIT serves 10th, 11th, and 12th grade students from the sending districts that meet class prerequisites.

Accreditation
The East Valley Institute of Technology is accredited by the North Central Association Commission on Accreditation and School Improvement.

Campuses

Dr. A. Keith Crandell (Main) Campus

The main campus, which opened in 1999, and is located at 1601 W. Main Street, was renamed the Dr. A. Keith Crandell Campus in December 2011.  It is located in west Mesa near Main Street and Dobson adjacent to the METRO light rail at Longmore/Main.

It spans 65 acres, features more than 15 buildings, and houses the Administrative and District offices along with Adult & Continuing Education.

East Campus

The East Campus located at 6625 S. Power Road opened in August 2011.  The 10-acre, $17 million campus adjacent to ASU Polytechnic, is focused on health, aviation, and cosmetology programs for high school students.

School districts

Apache Junction Unified School District/Apache Junction High School
Chandler Unified School District (5 high schools)
Higley Unified School District (2 high schools)
J. O. Combs Unified School District/Combs High School
Gilbert Public Schools (5 high schools)
Mesa Public Schools (6 high schools)
Queen Creek Unified School District/Queen Creek High School
Scottsdale Unified School District (4 high schools)
Tempe Union High School District (6 high schools)

Services
EVIT also includes services such as Shielded Metal Arc Welding (SMAW), Automotive and Collision Repair, Massage Therapy, Culinary and Baking services, Cosmetology Work-ups, Video Productions & Facility Rentals. These services are not free but are very affordable due to being provided by students, which is also part of their learning experience.

See also
Sycamore Drive (Dobson Road) and Main Street (Metro Light Rail station)
KVIT FM 88.7 MHz

References

External links
Official website

School districts in Arizona
School districts established in 1991
1991 establishments in Arizona